Drive All Night may refer to:

Drive All Night EP, a 2013 EP by Glen Hansard, or the title track
Drive All Night, a 1995 album by Jamie Anderson
"Drive All Night", a song by Bruce Springsteen from The River
"Drive All Night", a song by Needtobreathe from The Reckoning